Some Australian state schools, both primary and high, are supported by parents and citizens' associations also known as PCA or P&C. These groups provide volunteer support, raise funds for infrastructure and other expenses and assist in the administration of their school.

A large part of many P&C activities is the provision of subsidies to school excursions and other supplemental and extracurricular activities.

P&Cs encourage the general public and local businesses to become involved with their local schools.

Recent years have seen a number of changes to the environment in which P&Cs operate.
Volunteers sometimes require blue cards (criminal record checks) if they do not have children in the related school.
Tuckshops and fundraisers are required to sell only healthy foods.
Education Queensland has devolved many costs onto the school communities that were previously covered by the department. This has led to some schools requiring a "voluntary" payment from parents to cover consumables.

In Victoria, School Councils are similar to P&Cs, although they also have a more formal role in helping to manage the school.

See also
Parent-teacher association (PTA), the US and UK versions.

References

External links
 ACT Council of Parents & Citizens Associations
 Federation of Parents and Citizens' Associations of New South Wales
 Queensland Council of Parents and Citizens' Associations

Civic and political organizations of the United States
Educational organisations based in Australia